The 2010 Royal Rumble was the 23rd annual Royal Rumble professional wrestling pay-per-view (PPV) event produced by World Wrestling Entertainment (WWE). It was held for wrestlers from the promotion's Raw, SmackDown, and ECW brand divisions. The event took place on January 31, 2010, at the Philips Arena in Atlanta, Georgia. As has been customary since 1993, the Royal Rumble match winner received a world championship match at that year's WrestleMania. For the 2010 event, the winner received their choice to challenge for either Raw's WWE Championship, SmackDown's World Heavyweight Championship, or the ECW Championship at WrestleMania XXVI—this was the last Royal Rumble in which the ECW Championship was an option as the ECW brand was disbanded in February, also deactivating the title, thus also being WWE's last PPV to include the ECW brand.

Six professional wrestling matches were featured on the event's supercard, a scheduling of more than one main event. The main event was the 2010 Royal Rumble match, which featured wrestlers from all three brands. SmackDown's Edge, the twenty-ninth entrant, won the match by last eliminating Raw's John Cena, the nineteenth entrant. The primary match on the Raw brand was for the WWE Championship between reigning champion Sheamus and Randy Orton, which Sheamus won by disqualification. The primary match on the SmackDown brand was between The Undertaker and Rey Mysterio for the World Heavyweight Championship, which The Undertaker won to retain the championship. The featured match on the ECW brand was between Christian and Ezekiel Jackson for the ECW Championship, which Christian won to retain.

Production

Background
The Royal Rumble is an annual gimmick pay-per-view (PPV), produced every January by World Wrestling Entertainment (WWE) since 1988. It is one of the promotion's original four pay-per-views, along with WrestleMania, SummerSlam, and Survivor Series, dubbed the "Big Four". It is named after the Royal Rumble match, a modified battle royal in which the participants enter at timed intervals instead of all beginning in the ring at the same time. The 2010 event was the 23rd event in the Royal Rumble chronology and was scheduled to be held on January 31, 2010, at the Philips Arena in Atlanta, Georgia. It featured wrestlers from the Raw, SmackDown, and ECW brands.

The Royal Rumble match generally features 30 wrestlers. Traditionally, the winner of the match earns a world championship match at that year's WrestleMania. For 2010, the winner could choose to challenge for either Raw's WWE Championship, SmackDown's World Heavyweight Championship, or the ECW Championship at WrestleMania XXVI.

Storylines 
The card consisted of seven matches, as well as one dark match. The matches resulted from scripted storylines, where wrestlers portrayed heroes, villains, or less distinguishable characters to build tension and culminated in a wrestling match or series of matches. Results were predetermined by WWE's writers on the Raw, SmackDown, and ECW brands, with storylines produced on their weekly television shows, Raw, SmackDown, and ECW.

On the December 15, 2009 episode of ECW, general manager Tiffany announced that the ECW brand would host a competition called the "ECW Homecoming", where the winner will face Christian for the ECW Championship at the Royal Rumble. Featuring current and former wrestlers from the ECW brand, the first round of the competition consisted of eight singles matches. The winners would then qualify to the "Homecoming Finale" on the January 12, 2010 episode of ECW, where they would fight in an eight-man battle royal that will determine the competition winner. The first two qualifying matches were featured later that night with Ezekiel Jackson defeating Vladimir Kozlov and Kane defeating Zack Ryder. On the December 22, 2009 episode of ECW, Jack Swagger returned in a losing effort to Yoshi Tatsu, while Vance Archer advanced with a victory over Goldust. On the December 29, 2009 episode of ECW, Matt Hardy and Evan Bourne defeated Finlay and Mike Knox respectively to qualify. The two remaining qualifying matches were held on the January 5, 2010 episode of ECW and saw Shelton Benjamin defeating Chavo Guerrero Jr. and CM Punk defeating Mark Henry to qualify. Ezekiel Jackson won the "Homecoming Finale", last eliminating Kane, to earn the right to face Christian at the Royal Rumble.

On the January 4 episode of Raw, a fatal four-way match was held to determine the number one contender for WWE United States Championship featuring Montel Vontavious Porter, Mark Henry, Carlito and Jack Swagger. Porter emerged victorious by pinning Swagger, and earned a match against The Miz for the championship.

It was announced on December 31, 2009, on the company's official website that The Undertaker would be defending the World Heavyweight Championship at the Royal Rumble; the means of determining the challenger was stated to be via the "Beat the Clock Sprint", a series of matches that sees who ever wins their match in the fastest time would be declared the number-one contender. The sprint, held on the January 1, 2010, episode of SmackDown, consisted of four matches involving CM Punk, Kane, Chris Jericho, Rey Mysterio Jr., Dolph Ziggler, R-Truth, Matt Hardy, and Batista. The wrestler who won his match in the quickest time would earn the championship match. Punk defeated Hardy in his match, setting the time at 7:20. The next match featured Kane and Ziggler; both failed to beat the time limit and the match ended in a draw. Mysterio defeated his former rival Jericho one second faster than Punk's time, with 7:19. The final match was Batista versus R-Truth; the match resulted in another time-limit draw, due in part to interference from Mysterio. Despite Mysterio's fastest time, on-screen consultant Vickie Guerrero overruled the result, announcing a match the following week between Mysterio and Batista, who had disputably won his match. The match between the two on the January 8 episode of SmackDown was declared a no contest following both men being incapacitated. A rematch between the two was held the following week, this time inside a steel cage. Mysterio won the match, earning the right to face The Undertaker at the Royal Rumble.

The main event for Raw was determined on the January 11 episode with guest host Mike Tyson announcing the winner of a Triple Threat match later that night between John Cena, Kofi Kingston, and Randy Orton would advance to face Sheamus at the Royal Rumble for the WWE Championship. Orton ultimately won with the help of Legacy, who took out Cena and Kingston for him.

Since November of the previous year, WWE Women's Champion Michelle McCool had been relentlessly insulting Mickie James over a perceived weight issue. The two had a match at TLC: Tables, Ladders & Chairs, which saw McCool win, continuing the torment. James confronted McCool on the January 15 episode of SmackDown during a mocking monologue about James, leading to the champion assaulting her. It was also confirmed that day that McCool would defend her title again at the Royal Rumble against James.

Event

Before the event aired live on pay-per-view, an untelevised match took place in which Gail Kim, Kelly Kelly, Eve Torres, and Bella Twins (Nikki and Brie) defeated Maryse, Katie Lea Burchill, Jillian Hall, Alicia Fox, and Natalya in a 10-Diva tag team match.

Preliminary matches
The event opened with Christian defending the ECW Championship against Ezekiel Jackson, who was accompanied by William Regal. Regal attempted to interfere but the referee noticed, ejecting Regal from ringside. Christian executed the Killswitch on Jackson to retain the title.

Next, The Miz defended the WWE United States Championship against Montel Vontavious Porter, as Theodore Long booked in a backstage segment. After MVP chased Miz into the ring, Miz pinned him with a small package to retain the title.

After that, Sheamus defended the WWE Championship against Randy Orton. Sheamus dominated most of the match, targeting Orton's left arm. Sheamus attempted Pale Justice on Orton but Orton countered the move with a Rope Hung DDT. Orton pinned Sheamus but Sheamus touched the bottom rope, voiding the pinfall. Orton attempted a punt on Sheamus but Sheamus countered and targeted Orton's left arm. Cody Rhodes interfered and attacked Sheamus, meaning Sheamus retained the title by disqualification. After the match, Orton confronted and attacked Rhodes. Ted DiBiase Jr. came out but was also attacked by Orton. Sheamus attacked Orton with a Brogue Kick and celebrated his victory.

Next, Michelle McCool defended the WWE Women's Championship against Mickie James. McCool was accompanied by Layla. Before the match began, McCool taunted James by calling her "Piggy James" and Layla wore a fat suit to mock James. As the match started, "Piggy James" Layla tried to attack the genuine James but McCool accidentally executed a Big Boot on Layla. James took advantage and executed a Mickie DDT to win the title.

The fifth match featured The Undertaker defending the World Heavyweight Championship against Rey Mysterio Jr. After countering a Last Ride, Mysterio executed two 619s on Undertaker. Mysterio attempted a West Coast Pop but Undertaker caught Mysterio and executed a Last Ride to retain the title.

Main event

The main event was the Royal Rumble match for a world championship match at WrestleMania XXVI. Dolph Ziggler and Evan Bourne, the first two entrants, were quickly eliminated by the third entrant CM Punk. After eliminating both men, Punk began talking on the microphone, boasting of his intention to win, carrying this on for all of his time in the match. Punk quickly eliminated the fourth entrant, JTG, before being stopped by The Great Khali, the fifth entrant. The sixth person to enter the match was Beth Phoenix, who became only the second WWE Diva to participate in a Royal Rumble, after Chyna. Phoenix eliminated Khali by pulling him over the top rope while kissing him but was eliminated by Punk immediately afterwards. Triple H entered at number eight and eliminated Punk. Montel Vontavious Porter, the fourteenth entrant, was attacked by The Miz during his ring entrance and taken backstage by medical personnel without entering the match. Miz then entered at number sixteen but Porter returned to the match and eliminated both himself and Miz. The other half of D-Generation X, Shawn Michaels, entered at number eighteen and he and Triple H eliminated all the other competitors in the match, leaving themselves. Michaels and Triple H were immediately joined by the nineteenth entrant, John Cena. After double-teaming Cena and taking him down, Michaels performed a Sweet Chin Music on Triple H to eliminate him. Another notable moment in the match came when R-Truth eliminated Big Show and Mark Henry at the same time. Chris Jericho entered the ring as the twenty-eighth entrant and was soon joined by the twenty-ninth entrant, Edge, who was making his return following a six-month hiatus due to injury. Edge performed spears on Jericho, Michaels and Cena before eliminating Jericho. Batista entered at number thirty as the final entrant. This brought the final four down to Michaels, Cena, Edge and Batista. After all four competitors traded moves on each other, Batista eliminated Michaels, who tried to rejoin the match but was stopped, resulting in him superkicking a referee before walking to the back frustrated. After a quick back and forth, Cena eliminated Batista, bringing the final two down to himself and Edge. Cena countered a spear attempt from Edge and went to eliminate him, but Edge instead eliminated Cena to win the match. In doing so, Edge would gain the new record of spending the least amount of time in the rumble match before winning it. He was in the match for 7 minutes and 37 seconds, besting the previous record set by Cena by 51 seconds. This record lasted for 12 years until it was broken by Brock Lesnar in 2022.

Reception
The Royal Rumble received generally positive reviews from critics. The event earned 462,000 pay-per-view buys, an increase of 12,000 on the 2009 Royal Rumble.

Aftermath
After failing to win the Royal Rumble match and losing an Elimination Chamber qualifying match to Randy Orton, Shawn Michaels cost The Undertaker the World Heavyweight Championship against Chris Jericho in the SmackDown Elimination Chamber match at Elimination Chamber. As a result, Michaels challenged Undertaker to a rematch of their WrestleMania XXV match at WrestleMania XXVI. Undertaker agreed on the term that if Michaels lost, he would retire from professional wrestling. A stipulation was added that the match would be contested under no disqualifications and no countouts. At WrestleMania, Undertaker defeated Michaels to extend his WrestleMania winning streak to 18–0 and Michaels was forced to retire.

As a result of winning the 2010 Royal Rumble match, Edge earned the opportunity to wrestle for a world championship of his choosing at WrestleMania XXVI. After Chris Jericho won the World Heavyweight Championship from The Undertaker in an Elimination Chamber match at Elimination Chamber, Edge announced that he would wrestle Jericho, whom Edge had shared the WWE Undisputed Tag Team Championships with at the time of his injury, for the title. At WrestleMania, Jericho defeated Edge to retain the title. After the match, Edge would be frustrated, spearing Chris Jericho through the barricade in the process at ringside. The rivalry ended after Edge defeated Jericho in a Steel Cage match at Extreme Rules.

John Cena eliminated Batista from the Royal Rumble match, which started a conflict between Batista and Cena. On the February 1 episode of Raw, Cena rescued Bret Hart from an assault by Batista and Vince McMahon. After the show ended, Cena tried to help Hart but was attacked by Batista. At Elimination Chamber, Cena won the WWE Championship from Sheamus in an Elimination Chamber match. After the match, McMahon ordered Cena to defend the title against Batista. Batista defeated Cena to win the WWE Championship. At WrestleMania XXVI, Cena defeated Batista to regain the WWE Championship. Cena would retain the title against Batista in a Last Man Standing match at Extreme Rules and in an "I Quit" match at Over the Limit, which forced Batista to quit WWE.

After the Royal Rumble, Christian and Ezekiel Jackson continued to feud over the ECW Championship. On February 2, however, WWE Chairman Vince McMahon announced that ECW would be going off the air and would air its final episode on February 16. On the final episode of ECW, Jackson, with the help of William Regal, defeated Christian in an Extreme Rules match to become the final ECW Champion. Afterwards, the ECW brand was discontinued, subsequently retiring the championship. This would in turn be the last Royal Rumble in which three titles were an option for the Rumble winner until 2020.

Results

Royal Rumble entrances and eliminations
 – Raw
 – SmackDown
 – ECW
 – Winner

 1 – MVP was attacked by The Miz during his entrance, but later entered the match shortly after Miz's entry and eliminated both himself and Miz from the match.

References

External links

 Official website
 Official microsite

2010
Events in Atlanta
2010 in Georgia (U.S. state)
Professional wrestling in Atlanta
2010 WWE pay-per-view events
January 2010 events in the United States